Goshen is a town in Litchfield County, Connecticut, United States. The population was 3,150 at the 2020 census.

Geography
Goshen is in central Litchfield County and is bordered to the east by the city of Torrington. A large portion of the Mohawk State Forest is located in the town. The Appalachian Trail formerly passed through the town until it was re-routed west of the Housatonic River.

Principal communities
Goshen Center
West Goshen

Other minor communities and geographic areas in the town are Hall Meadow, North Goshen, Tyler Lake, West Side, and Woodridge Lake. Woodridge Lake is private. It is only available to residents (it is not a gated community). They have access to the clubhouse, and all of the lake's beaches.

History
The town was incorporated in 1739, one year after settlement of the town center began. The community was named after the Land of Goshen, in Egypt. The Congregational church was founded the following year. During the 18th century, Goshen was a farming, and later, prosperous business community. Gunmakers from the town such as the Medad Hills manufactured guns during the French and Indian War and Revolutionary War. Other notable business include the Pine Apple Cheese Factory and the Brooks pottery shop.

The first school in Goshen was built in 1753. A seminary for young women was established in 1819. The Goshen Academy was established several years later and became a well-regarded preparatory school during the 19th century.

Settlers from Goshen were the first to settle Hudson Township, Summit County, Ohio, in the Connecticut Western Reserve.

Notable locations

Historic sites in the town include:
 Hervey Brooks Pottery Shop and Kiln Site, an archeological site listed on the National Register of Historic Places (NRHP)
 Goshen Historic District (Goshen Center) – CT 63 and 4 and Gifford Rd., NRHP-listed
 West Goshen Historic District – roughly bounded by CT 4, Beach, Mill and Milton Sts., and Thompson Rd., NRHP-listed

Transportation
Connecticut Route 4 is the principal east–west through route in the town, while Connecticut Route 63 serves as the main north–south road. Route 4 leads east into Torrington and west into Cornwall, while Route 63 leads northwest to South Canaan and southeast to Litchfield.

Demographics

As of the census of 2000, there were 2,697 people, 1,066 households, and 814 families residing in the town. The racial makeup of the town was 98.26% White, 0.48% African American, 0.15% Native American, 0.74% Asian, and 0.37% from two or more races. Hispanic or Latino of any race were 1.22% of the population.

There were 1,066 households, out of which 29.4% had children under the age of 18 living with them, 67.5% were married couples living together, 5.4% had a female householder with no husband present, and 23.6% were non-families. 20.2% of all households were made up of individuals, and 6.9% had someone living alone who was 65 years of age or older.  The average household size was 2.53 and the average family size was 2.91.

In the town, the population was spread out, with 22.7% under the age of 18, 5.3% from 18 to 24, 25.1% from 25 to 44, 31.7% from 45 to 64, and 15.2% who were 65 years of age or older.  The median age was 43 years. For every 100 females, there were 97.4 males.  For every 100 females age 18 and over, there were 98.5 males.

The median income for a household in the town was $64,432, and the median income for a family was $72,452. Males had a median income of $48,125 versus $30,464 for females. The per capita income for the town was $33,925.  About 2.9% of families and 3.3% of the population were below the poverty line, including 4.1% of those under age 18 and 3.9% of those age 65 or over.

Arts and culture
Multiple events are hosted at the Goshen Fairgrounds each year, located on Route 63 south just outside the center of town. One such event is the Goshen Stampede, a festival held annually on Father's Day weekend that hosts a rodeo, demolition derby, music festival, and truck pull. Later in the summer on Labor Day weekend is the annual Goshen Fair. As the county's largest agricultural fair, it features farm animal judgement shows, competition and contest in log chopping, log sawing, hay-bale throwing and the like. There are food, art, photography, baked goods, and craft contests, as well as rides for children, carnival games, and craft and food vendors. Attendance over the three days can range up to 50,000 people.

Traditionally at the beginning of August, and usually the first Saturday, the Church of Christ presents an Annual Blueberry Festival where they sell blueberry pies, blueberries and host a blueberry breakfast. It is very well known and people from all around the area come to enjoy the festival and the pies. The blueberry pies are available for sale all year long, as well as other flavors made by hand by the congregation (apple, peach, and blueberry-peach). Mini pies are also sold by the church at the Goshen Fair.

The town is also home to the Goshen Players.

Notable people

 William R. Brewster, American Civil War general
 David Darling, cellist and composer
 Daniel S. Dickinson, U.S. senator
 Ezra Foot, Wisconsin state senator
 Eunice Newton Foote, scientist, inventor and woman's rights campaigner
 Asaph Hall, astronomer credited with discovering the moons of Mars
 Ivan Lendl, Professional Tennis Player and Coach
 Madeleine L'Engle, author
 Frederick Miles, congressman
 Ebenezer F. Norton, congressman
 Mary Pope Osborne, author
 Kevin Phillips, author and political analyst
 Isaac Williams, Jr., congressman

References

External links

Town of Goshen official website
Goshen Garden Club
Church of Christ Congregational

 
Towns in Litchfield County, Connecticut
Federal architecture in Connecticut
Historic districts in Litchfield County, Connecticut
Towns in the New York metropolitan area
Towns in Connecticut